Leza may refer to:

People
 Leza Lidow (1924–2014), artist
 Leza Lowitz (born 1962), American writer
 Leza McVey (1907–1984), American ceramist and weaver
 Marisa de Leza, Spanish film and television actress

Places
 Leza, Álava, Spain
 
 Leza de Río Leza, Spain